Upendra Matte Baa is a 2017 Indian Kannada-language supernatural drama film directed by N. Arun Lokanath (Loki). The film stars Upendra in dual roles along with Prema and Sruthi Hariharan. The film, a remake of Telugu-language film Soggade Chinni Nayana (2016), was produced by M. S. Sreekanth, M. S. Shashikanth and K. L. Ravindranath under the banner Hayagreeva Enterprises. The film's cinematography was handled by Swamy J. Gowda. The soundtrack and film score were composed by V. Sridhar.

The project marks the reunion of Upendra with director Loki after their previous film H2O in 2002. It also marks the comeback of actress Prema to films after a long hiatus which she took after Shishira (2009).

Plot
Ram "Ramu" Mohan is a socially-inept cardiologist practicing in the United States. His wife, Seetha, feels lonely since Ramu pays very little attention to her because of his work. They decide to divorce and leave for Sivapuram, Rajahmundry, where Ramu's mother Satyabhama lives. Satyabhama, shocked to learn that Ramu and Seetha are divorcing, shouts at a portrait of her deceased husband Upendra Raju (a benevolent, flirtatious zamindar who died nearly 30 years ago in an accident).

Upendra Raju's soul is in Naraka, where he continues to flirt. Yama, at Shiva's command, sends him back to earth because there is a mission only he can fulfil. Upendra Raju, who can be seen and heard only by Satyabhama, tries to solve his family's problems. After several unsuccessful attempts, Upendra Raju possesses Ramu's body on his birthday. He meets Ramu's young female cousins, and invites them to his home. On his way back Ramu meets Suri, a frightened drunk who runs away as Ramu and Upendra Raju look identical. To free himself from guilt, Suri later admits that he murdered Upendra Raju with a lorry after he was bribed. Before he can disclose more details, Suri dies in an accident and  Upendra Raju learns that his family is in danger. Ramu spends quality time with his cousins, making Seetha jealous.

Upendra Raju is confronted by Satyabhama, who is unaware of recent events. He suggests that she help Seetha impress Ramu. At Satyabhama's suggestion, Ramu and Seetha go to a theatre to watch a film. When she is taunted, Ramu (possessed by Upendra Raju) overpowers her tormenters. Seetha is pleasantly surprised, since Ramu failed to confront the same group earlier in a similar situation. The couple slowly grow closer, and Seetha realises that Ramu does love her. Upendra Raju learns from Athmanandam, a godman who can communicate with souls, that his uncle Rudraraju masterminded his murder. Rudraraju and his cousin, Veerababu, wanted to steal jewellery from a 1,000-year old temple to Shiva. They murdered Upendra Raju, bribing Suri to silence him.

After Rudraraju's son dies when he is bitten by a divine snake, a tantrik warns that only Upendra Raju's descendants can open the lock; others would be killed by the snake. The tantrik captures Upendra Raju's soul and gives a few threads to Sampath, Rudraraju's grandson, telling him to tie them to the hands of every member of Upendra Raju's family to keep his soul from communicating with them. After Sampath and the others leave, the snake kills the tantrik and saves Upendra Raju's soul.

Upendra Raju reaches the temple, where Satyabhama can neither see nor hear him and he cannot possess Ramu. Rudraraju and Sampath attack Ramu and Seetha after the jewellery is removed from the treasury. Rudraraju tells his henchmen to put the couple in a car with the jewellery, which will make the villagers think that they are the thieves. The thread to Ramu's hand comes loose, and Upendra Raju possesses him. Upendra Raju fights them and retrieves the jewellery before leaving Ramu, who operates on an injured Seetha in a nearby hospital. Satyabhama removes the thread and can see Upendra Raju. Ramu and Seetha reconcile, and Yama orders Upendra Raju to come back in accordance with Shiva's instructions. When Satyabhama begs Upendra Raju to stay, Yama gives him a chance to wipe away her tears. He asks her to keep smiling and live happily for his sake, and returns to Naraka.

Cast
 Upendra as Upendra Raju and Ramu
 Prema as Sathyabhama, Upendra Raju's Wife
 Sruthi Hariharan as Seetha
 Harshika Poonacha
 Sai Kumar as Yamadharmaraju
 Avinash as Rudraraju
 Vasishta N. Simha as Vashishta 
 Sadhu Kokila as Atmananda
 Shobaraj as Truck Driver
 Chamaraj Mulakeri

Soundtrack

V. Sridhar scored the soundtrack and score for this, his 25th film. A total of four songs were composed by him. The audio was released in September 2017 and Anand Audio bagged the audio rights of the film.

See also
 Soggade Chinni Nayana

References

2017 horror films
2010s Kannada-language films
2017 thriller drama films
Indian thriller drama films
Kannada remakes of Telugu films
Films scored by Sridhar V. Sambhram
Indian horror film remakes
Indian horror drama films
Indian supernatural horror films
2010s horror drama films
2017 drama films

kn:ಉಪೇಂದ್ರ ಮತ್ತೆ ಬಾ